This is a list of airports in Eswatini, sorted by location.

Eswatini is a landlocked country in southern Africa, bordered to the north, south and west by South Africa, and to the east by Mozambique. The nation, as well as its people, are named after the 19th-century king Mswati II. Eswatini is divided into four districts: Hhohho, Lubombo, Manzini, and Shiselweni. The capital of Eswatini is Mbabane, while the country's traditional and legislative capital is Lobamba.



Airports 
Names shown in bold indicate the airport has scheduled passenger service on commercial airlines.

Most of the airfields listed below are unpaved. The exceptions are Matsapha Airport and Sikhuphe International Airport.

The airstrip at Tshaneni is not to be confused with "Tshaneni Airport", a planned transportation hub based around the airstrip in Mkuze, a nearby town on the other side of the South African border.

See also 

 King Mswati III International Airport (SHO)
 Transport in Eswatini
 List of airports by ICAO code: F#FD - Eswatini
 Wikipedia: WikiProject Aviation/Airline destination lists: Africa#Eswatini

References 

 
  - includes IATA codes
 Great Circle Mapper: Airports in Eswatini - IATA and ICAO codes, coordinates
  King Mswati III. International Airport at Google maps

 
Eswatini
Airports
Airports
Eswatini